The Vol Network is the radio and television network of the University of Tennessee Volunteers women's and men's sports teams known as the Vols and Lady Vols. Established in 1949 and since 2019, it has been operated by Learfield IMG College.

It consists of two regional sports networks, about 67 radio stations (both AM and FM), as well as eight television stations across Tennessee, also serving varied portions of neighboring states, depending on the station and market.

Some of the Tennessee Vols’ pre-season exhibition and early season basketball games are also streamed via UTSports.com

History
The first Tennessee Volunteers football game radio broadcast was produced by the Vol Radio Network in 1949.
 The name of the radio network was given by the legendary Robert R. Neyland, with Lindsey Nelson serving as the first-ever play-by-play announcer.

Men's basketball games were added to the Vol Network's portfolio in the early 1950s. The Vol Network began broadcasting Tennessee Lady Vols basketball games in the 1977-1978 season.  When the Vol Network airs the women's basketball broadcasts, it is identified as the Lady Vol Network. It is claimed to be the largest women's college basketball radio network in the country.  

Host Communications managed media rights to University of Tennessee athletics, and operated the Vol Network from 1989 until November 2007, when Host Communications merged with IMG College, a division of IMG.

On-air personalities
Bob Kesling, Director of programming and Play-by-play announcer (1999-present)  1977 UT graduate; originally with WBIR-TV and Jefferson-Pilot Sports for the SEC syndicated TV package. 
Mickey Dearstone - Play-by-play commentator (Women's Basketball, 1998/99-present)  
Tim Priest, Color analyst (football) 
Bert Bertelkamp, Color Analyst (basketball) 
John Wilkerson, Studio game day host 
Brent Hubbs, spotter and reporter
Pat Ryan, analyst (football)
Lindsey Nelson , first broadcaster on Vol Network, 1948-1951

Notable personalities
John Ward, the “Voice of the Vols” (1968-1999 football; 1965-1999 basketball), famous for the phrase, “It’s Football Time in Tennessee,” and his touchdown call,”Give him six!” 
Bill Anderson, former football color analyst and broadcasting partner of Ward

Programming

Current television programming 
The Rick Barnes Show (2015-present) - men's basketball coach's show

Recent former television programming 
The Pat Summitt Show (1974-2012) - women's basketball coach's show
The Holly Warlick Show (2012-2019) - women's basketball coach's show 
The Bruce Pearl Show (2005-2011) - men's basketball coach's show; revived onto the Auburn IMG Sports TV Network in 2015 
The Cuonzo Martin Show (2011-2014) - men's basketball coach's show
The Donnie Tyndall Show (2014-2015) - men's basketball coach's show 
The Phillip Fulmer Show (1992-2008) - football coach's show 
The Derek Dooley Show (2010-2012) - football coach's show 
The Butch Jones Show (2013-2017) - football coach's show

Radio programming 
Big Orange Hotline - Monday evenings during football season (Knoxville, Tri-Cities, Nashville, and Chattanooga area affiliates only) 
Vol Calls - Monday Nights 8:00-9:00 PM ET (7:00-8:00 PM CT) 
The Rick Barnes Show - men's basketball coach's show (radio version) 
Tennessee Tip-off Show - men's basketball pre-game show

Television affiliates

Regional Sports Networks

Former TV affiliates

Radio affiliates

Current affiliates
Tennessee Volunteers games played at night used to be heard across 28 states in the eastern half of the United States and three provinces in eastern Canada thanks to a previous affiliation deal with Nashville's 50,000 watt clear-channel station WLAC. This ended in 2010 when that station lost the Vol Network affiliation to WGFX.

All affiliates broadcast men's and women's basketball as well as UT football unless otherwise stated in the notes column.   Fans out of range of all stations can also listen to the game broadcasts via the TuneIn and UT GameDay app or via the University of Tennessee sports website.

Tennessee

Other areas

Former affiliates

Tennessee

Other states 
Waynesville, North Carolina - WMXF-AM 1400 (football only, disaffiliated in 2010?)
Sheffield, Alabama - WSHF AM 1380 (football only, disaffiliated in 1990s)

Sponsors
DISH Network
Coca-Cola
Food City  
Farm Bureau Insurance Tennessee

See also
Tennessee Volunteers 
Tennessee Volunteers basketball
Tennessee Lady Volunteers basketball
Tennessee Volunteers football 
WKCE 1180 - Tennessee Sports Radio - Knoxville's local sports radio station (not part of the Vol Network). 
UK Sports Network - Kentucky’s statewide radio and TV network for the Vols’ SEC neighbor to the north, the Kentucky Wildcats.

References

External links
UTSports.com Official Website for University of Tennessee Athletics 
Vol Network on Facebook
@VolNetwork_IMG on Twitter
Tennessee Vol Network Online Store

 
 

 

College football on the radio
College basketball on the radio in the United States
Tennessee Volunteers and Lady Volunteers
University of Tennessee
Sports radio networks in the United States
Learfield IMG College sports radio networks